The year 1853 in architecture involved some significant architectural events and new buildings.

Events
 June 30 – Georges-Eugène Haussmann is selected as préfect of the Seine (department) to begin the re-planning of Paris.

Buildings and structures

Buildings

 Fastnet Rock Lighthouse is completed at the most southerly point of Ireland.
 The New York Crystal Palace is constructed for the Exhibition of the Industry of All Nations in New York City.
 The New York Cotton Exchange building is completed in New York City.
 Rhode Island Tool Company building is completed in Providence, Rhode Island.
 Charlbury railway station in Oxfordshire, England, designed by I. K. Brunel, is opened.

Awards
 RIBA Royal Gold Medal – Robert Smirke.
 Grand Prix de Rome, architecture – Arthur-Stanislas Diet.

Births
 February 26 – Antonio Rivas Mercado, Mexican architect, engineer and restorer (died 1927)
 June 21 – Peder Vilhelm Jensen-Klint, Danish architect, designer, painter and architectural theorist (died 1930)
 August 28 (August 16 O.S.) – Vladimir Shukhov, Russian structural engineer (died 1939)
 September 11 – Stanford White, American architect (died 1906)

Deaths
 December 12 – William Nichols, English-born American Neoclassical architect (born 1780)

References

Architecture
Years in architecture
19th-century architecture